This is a list of States and Union Territories of India by speakers of Kashmiri according to the 2011 census.

Notes

References

See also
States of India by urban population
States of India by size of economy

Kashmiri speakers
Kashmiri language